Chigogwe is an administrative ward in the Dodoma Urban district of the Dodoma Region of Tanzania. In 2016 the Tanzania National Bureau of Statistics report there were 7,913 people in the ward, from 7,281 in 2012.

References

Dodoma
Wards of Dodoma Region